John Eaton Tourtellotte (July 3, 1833 – July 22, 1891) was an American Union brevet brigadier general during the period of the American Civil War.  He received his appointment as brevet brigadier general dated to March 13, 1865.

Early life and military career
Tourtellotte was born on July 3, 1833, in either Windham, Connecticut, or Thompson, Connecticut.  He attended Brown University and studied law at New York state's Albany Law School.  After pursuing his education, he moved to Mankato, Minnesota.  When the Civil War began, he served as a private and a captain in the 4th Minnesota Volunteer Infantry Regiment.  On September 1, 1862, he was promoted to lieutenant colonel.  On October 5, 1864, he was promoted to colonel.  During the war, he participated in the Siege of Vicksburg.  In the Battle of Allatoona in Georgia, he commanded 2,000 Union troops to victory over 7,000 Confederates. On October 5, 1864, during the battle, he was wounded in the hip, but commanded from an ambulance instead of leaving the battlefield. The battle's victory inspired the song "Hold the Fort" by Philip Bliss. He recovered to participate in  Sherman's March to the Sea and the Battle of Bentonville.

After the war, Tourtellotte entered the army again. He was assigned to be Detailed Superintendent of Indian Affairs in Utah with the 26th Infantry Regiment. After serving, he was transferred to General Custer's army, but did not make it—he was called back to Washington D.C. by William Tecumseh Sherman. Tourtellotte served as Sherman's aide-de-camp from January 1, 1871, until February 8, 1884.  He finally retired from the army on March 20, 1885.

Later life and death
Though he moved to Washington D.C., Tourtellottee continued to visit and boost the city of Mankato. He donated $8,800 to build the first hospital in Mankato, and he continued to practice law in the city, as well as nearby Lake Crystal, Minnesota.

Tourtellotte died on July 22, 1891, and was buried at Arlington National Cemetery.

Tourtellotte Park and Pool
The hospital Tourtellotte helped build was torn down in 1903. Four decades later in the same location, the city developed and formed the 13-acre Tourtellotte Park. The park was built as a WPA project, and it included a bathhouse and Olympic-sized outdoor pool, which was also named after the colonel. Tourtellotte Pool and the bathhouse fell into disrepair in the 1980s, but were saved by donations from local residents.

See also 

 List of American Civil War brevet generals (Union)

References

External links
  (gravemarker at Arlington National Cemetery)
  (cenotaph at Tourtellotte Cemetery in Thompson, Connecticut)
 

1833 births
1891 deaths
People from Windham County, Connecticut
People from Mankato, Minnesota
People of Connecticut in the American Civil War
People of Minnesota in the American Civil War
Albany Law School alumni
Brown University alumni
Union Army generals
Burials at Arlington National Cemetery